Široká Niva (until 1952 Bretnov) is a municipality and village in Bruntál District in the Moravian-Silesian Region of the Czech Republic. It has about 500 inhabitants.

Administrative parts
Villages of Pocheň and Skrbovice are administrative parts of Široká Niva.

Geography
Široká Niva is located in the Nízký Jeseník mountain range. The Opava River flows through the municipality.

History
The first written mention of Markvartice is from 1278, the first written mention of Bretnov is from 1420. In 1949, the two municipalities were merged, and in 1952 the new municipality was renamed to its current name. Today Markvartice is only a local name of a small hamlet in Široká Niva.

Notable people
Anton Zimmermann (1741–1781), Slovak composer
Rudolf Koppitz (1884–1936), Austrian photographer

References

Gallery

External links

Villages in Bruntál District